Constantia is a genus of flowering plants from the orchid family, Orchidaceae. It contains 6 known species, all endemic to Brazil:

Constantia australis (Cogn.) Porto & Brade - Santa Catarina
Constantia cipoensis Porto & Brade - Minas Gerais
Constantia cristinae F.E.L.Miranda - Minas Gerais
Constantia gutfreundiana Chiron & V.P.Castro - Minas Gerais
Constantia microscopica F.E.L.Miranda - Minas Gerais
Constantia rupestris Barb.Rodr. - Rio de Janeiro

See also 
 List of Orchidaceae genera

References 

 Pridgeon, A.M., Cribb, P.J., Chase, M.A. & Rasmussen, F. eds. (1999). Genera Orchidacearum 1. Oxford Univ. Press.
 Pridgeon, A.M., Cribb, P.J., Chase, M.A. & Rasmussen, F. eds. (2001). Genera Orchidacearum 2. Oxford Univ. Press.
 Pridgeon, A.M., Cribb, P.J., Chase, M.A. & Rasmussen, F. eds. (2003). Genera Orchidacearum 3. Oxford Univ. Press
 Berg Pana, H. 2005. Handbuch der Orchideen-Namen. Dictionary of Orchid Names. Dizionario dei nomi delle orchidee. Ulmer, Stuttgart

External links 

Laeliinae genera
Orchids of Brazil
Laeliinae